David Rollo Anderson (born 8 April 1932) is an Australian rower who competed in the 1952 Summer Olympics, the 1954 Commonwealth Games and in the 1956 Summer Olympics.

Club and state rowing
Anderson attended Sydney Boys High School, graduating in 1948. Both Nimrod Greenwood  and Edward Pain, who were in the Australian eight at the 1952 Summer Olympics with Anderson, also attended Sydney High.

Anderson did his senior rowing at the Leichhardt Rowing Club in Sydney. The Guerin-Foster Rowing History site quotes the Leichhart Centennial History of 1986 wherein Anderson is referred to as the most prominent interstate and international Leichhardt rower up until 1986. In eight consecutive seasons from 1950 to 1957 he was selected in the New South Wales state eight which contested the Kings Cup at the Australian Rowing Championships. The New South Wales crew were national champions in 1950 and 1951 and were selected in toto as the Olympic representative eight for 1952 in spite of finishing second to Victoria in the Interstate Championships that year.

International representative rowing
In 1952 he was a crew member of the Australian boat which won the bronze medal in the eights event at the Helsinki Olympics. Four years later he was part of the Australian boat which was eliminated in the semi-final of the coxless fours competition. In 1954, he was part of the pair that won the gold medal Coxed Four, and the bronze in the uncoxed pPairs for Australia in the 1954 Canadian Commonwealth Games.

Personal
Anderson is the father of Wendy Laidlaw, who competed in the Australian women's basketball team at the 1984 Olympic Games held in Los Angeles.

References

External links
 Leichhardt History at Guerin-Foster 
 

1932 births
Possibly living people
Australian male rowers
Olympic rowers of Australia
Rowers at the 1952 Summer Olympics
Rowers at the 1956 Summer Olympics
Olympic bronze medalists for Australia
Olympic medalists in rowing
Medalists at the 1952 Summer Olympics
Commonwealth Games medallists in rowing
Commonwealth Games gold medallists for Australia
Commonwealth Games bronze medallists for Australia
Rowers at the 1954 British Empire and Commonwealth Games
Medallists at the 1954 British Empire and Commonwealth Games